Cochrane Castle was a castle,  west of Johnstone, Renfrewshire, Scotland, near the Black Cart Water.

History
The property was owned by the Cochranes in the 14th century; the family being elevated to Baron Cochrane of Dundonald in 1647, and Earl of Dundonald in 1669.  It was purchased by the Johnstones of Cochrane around 1760.

A monument to commemorate the castle was built in 1896.  It is a small corbiestepped tower, and incorporates a stone with the date 1592 and the Cochrane arms.

Structure
There are no remains at the site.

See also
Castles in Great Britain and Ireland
List of castles in Scotland

References

Castles in Renfrewshire
Johnstone